Shohely Akhter Khatun (born 16 June 1988) is a Bangladeshi cricketer who plays as a right-arm off break bowler. She appeared in two One Day Internationals and five Twenty20 Internationals for Bangladesh in 2013 and 2014. She played domestic cricket for Dhaka Division.
In September 2022, she was selected in the team for Women's T20 Asia Cup in Bangladesh, coming back in national side after 8 years.

Early life and background
Shohely was born on 16 June 1988 in Rajbari, Bangladesh.

Career

Asian Games
Akhter was part of the team that won a silver medal in cricket against the China national women's cricket team at the 2010 Asian Games in Guangzhou, China.

References

External links
 
 

1988 births
Living people
People from Rajbari District
Bangladeshi women cricketers
Bangladesh women One Day International cricketers
Bangladesh women Twenty20 International cricketers
Asian Games medalists in cricket
Cricketers at the 2010 Asian Games
Cricketers at the 2014 Asian Games
Asian Games silver medalists for Bangladesh
Medalists at the 2010 Asian Games
Medalists at the 2014 Asian Games
Dhaka Division women cricketers